Dumlupınar is a town and district of Kütahya Province in the Aegean region of Turkey.

Image gallery

See also 
 Battle of Dumlupınar
 Kütahya Dumlupınar University

References

External links 

  

Populated places in Kütahya Province
Districts of Kütahya Province